The destroyer  HNLMS Tjerk Hiddes was a British built, Dutch warship of World War II. She was laid down on 22 May 1940 as a British N-class destroyer and launched on 25 June 1941 as HMS Nonpareil, but on 27 May 1942, she was transferred to the Royal Dutch Navy. The ship was commissioned in 1942 as HNLMS Tjerk Hiddes, named after the 17th century Dutch admiral, Tjerk Hiddes de Vries. Much of her war service was with the Royal Navy and United States Navy in the Indian Ocean and Australia. Following the war, the destroyer was sold to Indonesia and renamed KRI Gadjah Mada. She was scrapped in 1961.

War service
Acceptance trials started on 6 May; she was commissioned into the Royal Netherlands Navy service on 27 May and Tjerk Hiddes was allocated to serve with the British Royal Navy's 7th Destroyer Flotilla in the Eastern Fleet.
 
At Scapa Flow, in June and early July, she worked-up with the Home Fleet and prepared for foreign service. In mid-July at the Clyde, she joined the escort of military convoy WS21P from the Clyde to the Indian Ocean. During the voyage, on 5 August the convoy was augmented by eight ships of Convoy AS4, carrying equipment for the 8th Army in Egypt. On 20 August, Tjerk Hiddes and Nepal left the convoy, sailing to Kilindini, in Kenya.

In September, Tjerk Hiddes joined the forces allocated to support landings to complete the occupation of Madagascar (Operation Streamline Jane), which was under the control of Vichy forces, and participated in preparatory exercises. On 9 September she left Kilindini to rendezvous with the assault convoy and its escort  on passage to Majunga for the landings. The two Dutch destroyers,  and Tjerk Hiddes were deployed as screen for HMS Illustrious.

On 26–27 September, Tjerk Hiddes returned to Kilindini for convoy escort duties in the Indian Ocean. (At this time, other vessels of the 7th Flotilla were returning from detached service in Mediterranean.) Escort duties continued through October until her deployment for convoy defence between Sydney and Fremantle, under the control of the United States 7th Fleet. This duty continued until January 1944, but on 4, 11 and 15 December, she made three voyages to evacuate Allied troops and civilians from Timor.

In January 1944, the Dutch ships Tjerk Hiddes, Van Galen and Tromp were transferred to the Eastern Fleet. On arrival in Trincomalee in February, Tjerk Hiddes rejoined the 7th Destroyer Flotilla for fleet screening and convoy protection duties in the Indian Ocean. From 22 to 24 February, she joined an unsuccessful search for a German blockade runner en route from Japan to Germany

On 22 March, Tjerk Hiddes deployed with a large fleet to practice at-sea refuelling and to rendezvous with the US aircraft carrier . Saratogas role was predominantly to act as a mentor for Commonwealth units intended for service in the western Pacific (as the British Pacific Fleet) with the United States Navy, where these units would have to convert to use American procedures. As a part of the retraining, Commonwealth and United States naval aircraft executed attacks on Japanese oil installations. Apart from the training and the damage thus caused, it was hoped that Japanese forces would be diverted from regions where the Americans planned to take the offensive.

Tjerk Hiddes had to return prematurely to Trincomalee on 25 March, with mechanical defects, and remained under repair until June, when she returned to convoy escort duties in the Indian Ocean.

In October 1944, she returned to the United Kingdom, joining the 8th Destroyer Flotilla at Plymouth on convoy duties in the Southwest Approaches. She moved to Dundee for a refit from May to August 1945, by which time the war was over.

Post war

Tjerk Hiddes resumed peace time service with the Royal Netherlands Navy after completion of the refit at Dundee. She returned to the Dutch East Indies, and was transferred to newly independent Indonesia in March 1951. She was renamed RI Gadjah Mada and became the flagship of the Indonesian Navy.

On 17 April 1958, Gadjah Mada took part in Operation 17 August, an amphibious landing to crush PRRI rebellion in West Sumatra. She acted as shore bombardment to support Indonesian Marines landing on Tabing Beach, Padang.

In June 1958, destroyer  Gadjah Mada along with Bathurst-class corvette RI Pati Unus and Albatros-class corvettes RI Sultan Hasanudin and RI Pattimura took part as shore bombardment in Operation Independence I, an amphibious landing at Kema, North Sulawesi to capture the Permesta rebel capital of Manado.

She was removed from the active list in 1961. The ship was scrapped in 1961 by F. Rijsdijk, in Hendrik-Ido-Ambacht.

Notes

References
 
 
 
 

 

 
 
  (in Indonesian)

External links
 HNMS Tjerk Hiddes – Timor Ferry
 The Battle of Timor (1942–43)
 Picture of HNLMS Tjerk Hiddes
 KRI Gadjah Mada: Flagship dan Destroyer Pertama TNI-AL (in Indonesian)
 

J, K and N-class destroyers of the Royal Navy
Ships built on the River Clyde
1941 ships
World War II destroyers of the United Kingdom
N-class destroyers of the Royal Netherlands Navy
World War II destroyers of the Netherlands